The Duchy of Prudnik was one of the numerous duchies of Silesia ruled by the Silesian branch of the royal Polish Piast dynasty. Its capital was Prudnik in Upper Silesia.

History 

The Duchy of Prudnik was separated from the Kingdom of Bohemia by Nicholas II in 1318. He ruled over the duchy until 1337, when he was forced to give Prudnik to Bolesław the Elder. The duchy returned under Nicholas' rule in 1361 thanks to his marriage with Juta, the princess of Niemodlin and daughter of Bolesław. 

After the death of Euphemia of Masovia, widow of Vladislaus II of Opole by 1424, Bernard of Niemodlin and his brother Bolko IV of Opole inherited her dower lands, Głogówek, which at the end of that year was given to Bolko IV's son, Bolko V the Hussite.

In 1424, after Bolko V the Hussite became the independent ruler over Głogówek and Prudnik thanks to the resignation of both his father and uncle Bernard, forming the united Duchy of Głogówek and Prudnik.

Dukes of Prudnik 
 1318–1337 – Nicholas II of Opava
 1337–1361 – Bolesław the Elder
 1361–1365 – Nicholas II of Opava
 1365–1367 – Bolesław II of Niemodlin, Wenceslaus of Niemodlin and Henry of Niemodlin
 1367–1368 – Bolesław II of Niemodlin
 1368–1382 – Henry of Niemodlin
 1382–1388 – Vladislaus II of Opole
 1388–1397 – Henry VIII the Sparrow
 1397–1420 – Catherine of Opole
 1420–1424 – Bernard of Niemodlin

References 

Duchies of Silesia
States and territories established in 1318
1424 disestablishments in Europe
1318 establishments in Europe
History of Prudnik